Joseph Clements is an Australian actor who played Senior Sergeant Allan Steiger in the television soap opera, Neighbours, from 2004 to 2007.

Biography
Clements had a role as 'Simmo' in 1993 Australian sitcom Newlyweds, and has had guest roles in Water Rats (1996), Blue Heelers (2001), and The Secret Life of Us (2005). Clements performs as Ned Kelly in a live performance of the outlaw's life story at the Old Melbourne Gaol on a regular basis. He starred in the 2001 movie When Good Ghouls Go Bad along with Back to the Future star Christopher Lloyd. He played a minor role in the movie Yolngu Boy. Clements has been credited under the alias Jose Element, due to a typographical error. He also played an extra in Channel Seven's Thank God You're Here Season Finale.

He has also appeared in Transport Accident Commission advertisements playing the role of a police Senior Sergeant warning people against the dangers of poor road use.

Clements sang in a rock band, The Joes.

References

Australian male television actors
Australian male singers
Living people
Year of birth missing (living people)